This is a list of Honorary Fellows of Clare Hall in the University of Cambridge. See also :Category:Alumni of Clare Hall, Cambridge.

 Barbara Aland
 Eric Ashby, Baron Ashby
 Dame Gillian Beer
 Helaine Blumenfeld
 Lee Bollinger
 Frederick Burkhardt
 Sir Philip Campbell
 Norman Davies
 Richard J. Eden
 Ralph Erskine
 Michael Green
 Sir Martin Harris
 Robert Honeycombe
 David Ibbetson
 Ra Jong Yil
 Kim Dae-jung
 Dame Emma Kirkby
 Anthony Low
 Paul Mellon
 Keith Peters
 Brian Pippard
 Martin Rees, Baron Rees of Ludlow
 Marilynne Robinson
 Ekhard Salje
 Michael Stoker

Clare Hall, Cambridge
Fellows of Clare Hall, Cambridge
Clare Hall